The bidding process for the UEFA Euro 2032 will be the process by which the location for the 19th European Championship, commonly referred to as Euro 2032, will be selected.

Hosting requirements
Bid requirements must contain specific criteria relating to the respect of human rights, based on the United Nations "Guiding Principles on Business and Human Rights".

The tournament is expected to continue the format of the 2016, 2020, 2024 and 2028 editions, with a total of 51 matches taking place for a duration of up to 32 days, with 24 teams competing in the tournament.

The required capacities for the ten stadiums are as follows:
 1 stadium with 60,000 seats
 1 stadium (preferably 2) with 50,000 seats
 4 stadiums with 40,000 seats
 3 stadiums with 30,000 seats

Schedule

Bids

Confirmed plan to bid

Italy

 – In February 2019, Italian Football Federation President Gabriele Gravina told Sky Sport Italia that the federation was considering a bid. The bid was proposed again by Gravina some few days after Italy's win at Euro 2020. In February 2022, the Italian federation announced it would bid for Euro 2032, instead of 2028, as it would allow them more time to redevelop facilities.
On 17 November 2022, a shortlist of 11 cities was revealed (Milan, Turin, Verona, Genoa, Bologna, Florence, Rome, Naples, Bari, Cagliari and Palermo), a final list of 10 cities will be submitted to UEFA in April 2023. These are the stadiums that will be considered for the final 10:
Milan – New San Siro, capacity 65,000-70,000 (new stadium replacing San Siro)
Turin – Juventus Stadium, capacity 41,507
Turin – Stadio Olimpico Grande Torino, capacity 28,177 (to be improved)
Verona – Stadio Marc'Antonio Bentegodi, capacity 39,371  (to be renovated)
Genoa – Stadio Luigi Ferraris, capacity 36,205 (to be renovated)
Bologna – Stadio Renato Dall'Ara, capacity 38,279 (to be renovated)
Florence – Stadio Artemio Franchi, capacity 43,147 (to be renovated)
Rome – Stadio Pietralata, proposed capacity 55,000 (expandable to 62,000) (new stadium)
Rome – Stadio Flaminio, proposed capacity 30,000 (to be renovated)
Rome – Stadio Olimpico, capacity 70,634
Naples – Stadio Diego Armando Maradona, capacity 54,726 (to be renovated)
Bari – Stadio San Nicola, capacity 58,270 (to be renovated)
Cagliari – Unipol Stadium, capacity 25,000 (expandable to 30,000) (new stadium)
Palermo – Stadio Renzo Barbera, capacity 36,349 (to be renovated)

Turkey

 – On 15 August 2019, the Turkish Football Federation announced that Turkey will bid to host Euro 2032. The Federation confirmed the submission of its application on 23 March 2022. Turkey's bid is the seventh consecutive bid of the country, having bid in 2008, 2012, 2016, 2020, 2024 and 2028.
 Ankara – New Ankara Stadium, capacity 65,307
 Antalya – New Antalya Stadium, capacity 43,616 (after expansion)
 Bursa – Timsah Arena, capacity 43,331
 Eskişehir – New Eskişehir Stadium, capacity 34,930
 Gaziantep – New Gaziantep Stadium, capacity 35,219
 Istanbul – Atatürk Olympic Stadium, capacity 92,208 (after expansion)
 Istanbul – Nef Stadium, capacity 53,611 (after renovation)
 İzmit – İzmit Stadium, capacity 34,712
 Konya – Konya Büyükşehir Stadium, capacity 37,829 (after renovation)
 Trabzon – Şenol Güneş Stadium, capacity 43,233 (after renovation)

Ineligible bids
 – On 12 June 2021, Alexej Sorokin, the organising committee director of Euro 2020 host Saint Petersburg, proposed an application from Russia for Euro 2028 or 2032. This was reaffirmed on 23 March 2022, the deadline for bids. On 2 May 2022, UEFA declared their bids for 2028 and 2032 as ineligible due to the 2022 Russian invasion of Ukraine, citing that it breaches article 16.2 of the Bid Regulations, which state "each bidder shall ensure that it does not act in a manner that could bring Uefa, any other bidder, the bidding procedure or European football into disrepute".

References

2032